In Greek mythology, the Hecatoncheires, or Hundred-Handers, also called the Centimanes, named Cottus, Briareus (or Aegaeon) and Gyges (or Gyes), were three monstrous giants, of enormous size and strength, each with fifty heads and one hundred arms.  In the standard tradition they were the offspring of Uranus (Sky) and of Gaia (Earth), and helped Zeus and the  Olympians to overthrow the Titans in the Titanomachy.

Names
The three Hundred-Handers were named Cottus, Briareus and Gyges. Cottus (Κόττος) is a common Thracian name, and is perhaps related to the name of the Thracian goddess Kotys. The name Briareus (Βριάρεως) was probably formed from the Greek βριαρός meaning "strong". Hesiod's Theogony also calls him "Obriareus". The name Gyges is possibly related to the mythical Attic king Ogyges (Ὠγύγης). "Gyes", rather than Gyges, is found in some texts.

Homer's Iliad gives Briareus a second name, saying that Briareus is the name the gods call him, while Aegaeon (Αἰγαίων) is the name that men call him. The root αἰγ- is found in words associated with the sea: αἰγιαλός "shore", αἰγες and αἰγάδες "waves". The name suggests a connection with the Aegean Sea. Poseidon was sometimes called Aegaeon or Aegaeus (Αἰγαῖος). Aegaeon could be a patronymic, i.e. "son of Aegaeus",  or it could instead mean "the man from Aegae".

The name Hecatoncheires derives from the Greek ἑκατόν (hekaton, "hundred") and χείρ (cheir, "hand” or "arm"). Although the Theogony describes the three brothers as having one hundred hands (ἑκατὸν μὲν χεῖρες),  the collective name Hecatoncheires (Ἑκατόγχειρες), i.e. the Hundred-Handers, is never used. The Theogony once refers to the brothers collectively as "the gods whom Zeus brought up from the dark", otherwise it simply uses their individual names: Cottus, Briareus (or Obriareus) and Gyges.

The Iliad does not use the name Hecatoncheires either, although it does use the adjective hekatoncheiros (ἑκατόγχειρος), i.e. "hundred-handed", to describe Briareus. It is possible that Acusilaus used the name, but the first certain usage is found in the works of the mythographers such as Apollodorus.

Mythology

The Hundred-Handers
The Hundred-Handers, Cottus, Briareus and Gyges, were three monstrous giants, of enormous size and strength, with fifty heads and one hundred arms. They were among the eighteen offspring of Uranus (Sky) and Gaia (Earth), which also included the twelve Titans, and the three one-eyed Cyclopes. According to the Theogony of Hesiod, they were the last of these children of Uranus to be born, while according to the mythographer Apollodorus they were the first. In the Hesiodic tradition, they played a key role in the Greek succession myth, which told how the Titan Cronus overthrew his father Uranus, and how in turn Zeus overthrew Cronus and his fellow Titans, and how Zeus was eventually established as the final and permanent ruler of the cosmos.

According to the standard version of the succession myth, given in the accounts of Hesiod and Apollodorus, the Hundred-Handers, along with their brothers the Cyclopes, were imprisoned by their father Uranus. Gaia induced Cronus to castrate Uranus, and Cronus took over the supremacy of the cosmos. With his sister the Titaness Rhea, Cronus fathered several offspring, but he swallowed each of them at birth. However, Cronus' last child Zeus was saved by Rhea, and Zeus freed his brothers and sisters, and together they (the Olympians) began a great war, the Titanomachy, against the Titans, for control of the cosmos. Gaia had foretold that, with the help of the Hundred-Handers, the Olympians would be victorious, so Zeus released them from their captivity and the Hundred-Handers fought alongside the Olympians against the Titans and were instrumental in the Titans' defeat. The Titans were then imprisoned in Tartarus with the Hundred-Handers as their guards.

The lost epic poem the Titanomachy (see below), although probably written after Hesiod's Theogony, perhaps preserved an older tradition in which the Hundred-Handers fought on the side of the Titans, rather than the Olympians. According to a euhemeristic rationalized account, given by Palaephatus,  Cottus and Briareus, rather than being hundred-handed giants, were instead men, who were called the Hundred-Handers because they lived in a city called Hecatoncheiria ("Hundredarm"). They came to the aid of the residents of the city of Olympia (i.e. the Olympians) in driving away the Titans from their city.

Briareus/Aegaeon

Briareus was the most prominent of the three Hundred-Handers. In Hesiod's Theogony he is singled out as being "good", and is rewarded by Poseidon, who gives Briareus his daughter Cymopolea (otherwise unknown) for his wife.

In Homer's Iliad, Briareus is given a second name, Aegaeon, saying that Briareus is the name the gods call him, while mortals call him Aegaeon. It is told in the  Iliad how, during a palace revolt by the Olympians Hera, Poseidon and Athena, who wished to chain Zeus, the sea goddess Thetis brought to Olympus:

This second name does not seem to be a Homeric invention. According to the scholiast on Apollonius of Rhodes, the legendary seventh-century BC poet Cinaethon apparently knew both names for the Hundred-Hander. The name also appears in the lost epic poem the Titanomachy.

One of Saturn's moons was named after Aegaeon in 2009.

Titan ally
While in Hesiod and Homer, the powerful Hundred-Hander Briareus was a faithful and rewarded ally of Zeus, the Titanomachy seems to have reflected a different tradition. Apparently, according to the Titanomachy, Aegaeon was the son of Gaia and Pontus (Sea), rather than Gaia and Uranus, and fought on the side of the Titans, rather than the Olympians. The scholiast on  Apollonius of Rhodes, tells us that according to Cinaethon, Aegeaon was defeated by Poseidon. Apollonius of Rhodes mentions the "great tomb of Aegaeon", seen by the Argonauts when "they were passing within sight of the mouth of the Rhyndacus ... a short distance beyond Phrygia". The scholiast on Apollonius, says that the tomb marked the spot where Aegaeon's defeat occurred.

As in the lost Titanomachy, for the Latin poets Virgil and Ovid, Briareus was also an enemy of the gods, rather than an ally.  In his Aeneid, Virgil has Aegaeon make war against the gods, "with fifty sounding shields and fifty swords". Ovid, in his poem Fasti, has Briareus on the side of the Titans. As Ovid tells us, after the Titans had been overthrown, apparently in order to restore the Titans to power, Briareus sacrificed a bull, about which it had been prophesied that whoever burned its entrails would be able to conquer the gods. However just when Briareus was about to burn the entrails, birds snatched them away, and were rewarded with a home among the stars.

Association with the sea
In the lost epic Titanomachy, Aegaeon was the son of Pontus (Sea), and lived in the sea. Briareus/Aegaeon's association with the sea can perhaps already be seen in Hesiod and Homer. In the Theogony, Briareus ends up living, apart from his brothers, with Cymopolea the (sea-nymph?) daughter of Poseidon the god of the sea, where it might be supposed the couple dwells, while in the Iliad one might also suppose that Briareus  dwells in the sea, since it was the sea goddess Thetis that fetched him to Olympus. Apparently, this was made explicit by the fifth-century BC poet Ion of Chios, who referring to the Homeric story of the Olympians' revolt against Zeus, said that Aegaeon was the son of Thalassa (Sea) and that Thetis "summoned him from the Ocean". A connection to the sea can also be seen in the name Aegaeon (Αἰγαίων᾽) itself. The root αἰγ- is found in words associated with the sea: αἰγιαλός 'shore', αἰγες and αἰγάδες 'waves'. while Poseidon himself was sometimes called Aegaeon.

Later writers also make Briareus/Aegaeon's association with the sea explicit. According to Aelian, Aristotle said that the Pillars of Heracles (i.e. the Strait of Gibraltar) had been previously named the Pillars of Briareus. Ovid, in his Metamorphoses, describes Aegaeon as a "dark-hued" sea god "whose strong arms can overpower huge whales", while according to Arrian apparently, the Aegean Sea was said to have been named after Aegaeon. As reported by Pliny, according to the Euboean Archemachus, the first man to sail in a "long ship” was Aegaeon.

Oeolyca
According to the sixth-century BC lyric poet Ibycus, the belt that Heracles was sent to fetch in his ninth labour (usually said to have belonged to Hippolyta), belonged to Oeolyca, the daughter of Briareus.

Euboea
Briareus/Aegaeon had a particular connection with the Greek island of Euboea. According to the third-century Latin grammarian Solinus, Briareus was worshipped at Carystus, and Aegaeon at Chalcis. Aegaeon was said to be the name of a ruler of Carystus, which had also been named  Aigaie (Αίγαίη) after him, while Briareus was said to be the father of Euboea, after whom the island took its name. Aegeaon was perhaps associated with the place name Aegae mentioned by Homer (Il. 13.21, Od. 5.381) as Poseidon's home, and located by Strabo (8.7.4, 9.2.13) in Euboea north of Chalcis, as a place where Poseidon had a temple.

Poseidon
Briareus/Aegaeon seems also closely connected with Poseidon. The name Aegaeon has associations with Poseidon. As noted above, Homer locates Poseidon's palace in Aegae. Poseidon was sometimes himself called Aegaeon, or Aegaeus (Αἰγαῖος), and Aegaeon could mean 'son of Aegaeus'.

Homer says that Briareus/Aegaeon "is mightier than his father", but who Homer is referring to as the father is unclear. It has been sometimes supposed that contrary to Hesiod, who makes Uranus the father of Briareus, Cottus and Gyges, the father being referred to here is Poseidon, although this interpretation of Homer is uncertain at best.

In the Theogony Briareus becomes the son-in-law of Poseidon, while Poseidon, whether regarded as the father of Briareus/Aegaeon, or not, is a central figure in the story told about the Hundred-Hander in the ‘’Iliad’’. Both are sea-gods with a special connection to Euboea. As noted above Poseidon was sometimes called Aegaeon, and it is possible that Aegaeon was an older cult-title for Poseidon, however according to Lewis Richard Farnell, it is more likely that Poseidon inherited the title of an "older Euboean sea-giant".

As mentioned above, the scholiast on  Apollonius of Rhodes, tells us that according to Cinaethon, Aegeaon was defeated by Poseidon. Possibly then, Briareus/Aegaeon was an older (pre-Greek?) sea-god eventually displaced by Poseidon.

According to a Corinthian legend, Briareus was the arbitrator in a dispute between Poseidon and Helios (Sun) over some land, deciding that the Isthmus of Corinth belonged to Poseidon and the acropolis of Corinth (Acrocorinth) to Helios.

Buried under Etna, inventor of armour
The third-century BC poet Callimachus, apparently confusing Briareus as one of the Giants, says he was buried under Mount Etna in Sicily, making his shift from one shoulder to the other, the cause of earthquakes. Like Callimachus, Philostratus also makes Aegaeon the cause of earthquakes. According to an Oxyrhynchus papyrus, “the first to use metal armour was Briareos, whilst previously men protected their bodies with animal skins.” These stories are perhaps connected to a myth which may have made Briareus, like the Olympian god Hephaestus, a subterranean smith, who used the fires of Mount Etna as a forge for metalworking.

Possible origins
Briareus and Aegean, were perhaps originally, separate entities. Briareus/Aegaeon may have once been a many-armed sea monster, personifying the uncontrolled power of the sea itself. As noted above, Briareus/Aegaeon may have been an older god of the sea, replaced by Poseidon. He was perhaps a Greek reflection of Near-Eastern traditions in which the Sea challenged the storm-god, such as in the Ugaritic tradition of the battle between Yammu (Sea) and the storm-god Baal.

Principal sources

The Theogony
According to the Theogony of  Hesiod, Uranus (Sky) mated with Gaia (Earth) and produced eighteen children.  First came the twelve Titans, next the three one-eyed Cyclopes, and finally the three monstrous brothers Cottus, Briareus and Gyges. As the Theogony describes it:

Uranus hated his children, including the Hundred-Handers, and as soon as each was born, he imprisoned them underground, somewhere deep inside Gaia. As the Theogony describes it, Uranus bound the Hundred-Handers 

Eventually Uranus' son, the Titan Cronus, castrated Uranus, freeing his fellow Titans (but not, apparently, the Hundred-Handers), and Cronus became the new ruler of the cosmos. Cronus married his sister Rhea, and together they produced five children, whom Cronus swallowed as each was born, but the sixth child, Zeus, was saved by Rhea and hidden away to be raised by his grandmother Gaia. When Zeus grew up, he caused Cronus to disgorge his children, and a great war was begun, the Titanomachy, between Zeus and his siblings, and Cronus and the Titans, for control of the cosmos.

Gaia had foretold that Zeus would be victorious with the help of the Hundred-Handers, so Zeus released the Hundred-Handers from their bondage under the earth, and brought them up again into the light. Zeus restored their strength by feeding them nectar and ambrosia, and then asked the Hundred-Handers to "manifest your great strength and your untouchable hands" and join in the war against the Titans.

And Cottus, speaking for the Hundred-Handers, agreed saying:

And so the Hundred-Handers "took up their positions against the Titans ... holding enormous boulders in their massive hands", and a final great battle was fought. Striding forth from Olympus, Zeus unleashed the full fury of his thunderbolt, stunning and blinding the Titans, while the Hundred-handers pelted them with enormous boulders:

Thus the Titans were finally defeated and cast into Tartarus, where they were imprisoned.

As to the fate of the Hundred-Handers, the Theogony first tells us that they returned to Tartarus, to live nearby the "bronze gates" of the Titans' prison, where presumably, they took up the job of the Titans' warders. However, later in the poem, we are told that Cottus and Gyges "live in mansions upon the foundations of Ocean", while Briareus, "since he was good" became the son-in-law of Poseidon, who gave him "Cymopoliea his daughter to wed".

The Iliad
In a story that survives nowhere else, the Iliad briefly mentions Briareus (where it is said he was also called Aegaeon), referring to his having been summoned to Zeus' defense when "the other Olympians wished to put [Zeus] in bonds, even Hera and Poseidon and Pallas Athene." Achilles, while asking his mother the sea goddess Thetis to intercede with Zeus on his behalf, reminds her of a frequent boast of hers, that, at a time when the other Olympians wished to bind Zeus, she saved him by fetching the hundred-handed Briareus to Olympus:

Who Homer means here as the father of Briareus/Aegaeon is unclear.

The Titanomachy
The lost epic poem the Titanomachy, based on its title, must have told the story of the war between the Olympians and the Titans. Although probably written after Hesiod's Theogony, it perhaps reflected an older version of the story. Only references to it by ancient sources survive, often attributing the poem to Eumelus a semi-legendary poet from Corinth. One mentions Aegaeon, the name identified with the Hundred-Hander Briareus in the Iliad. According to a scholion on Apollonius of Rhodes' Argonautica:

Thus the  Titanomachy apparently followed a different tradition than the more familiar account in the Theogony. Here Briareus/Aegaeon was the son of Earth (Gaia) and Sea (Pontus) rather than Earth and Sky (Uranus), and he fought against the Olympians, rather than for them.

Ion of Chios
According to the same scholion on Apollonius of Rhodes mentioned above, the fifth-century BC poet Ion of Chios said that Aegaeon (who Thetis summoned in the Iliad to aid Zeus), lived in the sea and was the son of Thalassa.

Virgil
The first-century BC Latin poet Virgil, in his Aeneid, may have drawn on the same version of the story as that given in the lost Titanomachy. Virgil locates Briareus, as in Hesiod, in the underworld, where the Hundred-Hander dwells among "strange prodigies of bestial kind", which include the Centaurs, Scylla, the Lernaean Hydra, the Chimaera, the Gorgons, the Harpies, and Geryon.

Later Virgil describes the "hundred-handed" Aegaeon (the Iliad'''s Briareus):

Here Virgil has the Hundred-Hander as having fought on the side of the Titans rather than the Olympians, as in the Titanomachy, with the additional descriptive details of the fifty fire-breathing mouths and breasts, and the fifty sets of sword and shield, perhaps also coming from that lost poem.

Ovid
The late first-century BC Latin poet Ovid, makes several references to the Hundred-Handers Briareus and Gyges in his poems. Briareus figures in a story that Ovid tells in his Fasti about how "The star of the Kite" (presumably a star or constellation named after the bird) came to reside in the heavens. According to Ovid, there was a monstrous offspring of "mother Earth", part bull, part serpent, about which it had been prophesied that whoever burned its entrails would be able to conquer the gods. Warned by the three Fates, Styx penned up the bull in "gloomy woods" surrounded by three walls.  After the Titans were overthrown, Briareus (whom Ovid appears to regard as a Titan, or Titan ally) "sacrificed" the bull with an adamantine axe. But when he was about to burn the entrails, the birds, as commanded by Jupiter (Zeus), snatched them away, and were rewarded with a home among the stars. In his Metamorphoses, Ovid describes Aegaeon (the Iliad's Briareus) as a "dark-hued" sea god "whose strong arms can overpower huge whales". In both of these poems, Ovid appears to be following the same tradition as in the lost Titanomachy, where Aegaeon was the sea god son of Pontus and a Titan ally.

Ovid mentions "Gyas of the hundred hands" in his Amores, when "Earth made her ill attempt at vengeance, and steep Ossa, with shelving Pelion on its back, was piled upon Olympus." In his Fasti, Ovid has Ceres (Demeter), complaing about the abduction of her daughter, say: "What worse wrong could I have suffered if Gyges had been victorious and I his captive." In both of these poems, Ovid has apparently confused the hundred-handers with the Giants (a different set of monstrous offspring of Gaia) who tried to storm Olympus in the Gigantomachy. Ovid perhaps also confused the Hundred-Handers with the Giants in his Metamorphoses, where he refers to the Giants having tried to "fix their hundred arms on captive Heaven".  Ovid also refers to "a hundred-handed Gyes" in his Tristia.

Apollodorus
The mythographer Apollodorus, gives an account of the Hundred-Handers similar to that of Hesiod's, but with several significant differences. According to Apollodorus, they were the first offspring of Uranus and Gaia, (unlike Hesiod who makes the Titans the eldest) followed by the Cyclopes, and the Titans.

Apollodorus describes the Hundred-Handers as "unsurpassed in size and might, each of them having a hundred hands and fifty heads."

Uranus bound the Hundred-Handers and the Cyclopes, and cast them all into Tartarus, "a gloomy place in Hades as far distant from earth as earth is distant from the sky." But the Titans are, apparently, allowed to remain free (unlike in Hesiod). When the Titans overthrew Uranus, they freed the Hundred-Handers and Cyclopes (unlike in Hesiod where they remain imprisoned), and made Cronus their sovereign. But Cronus once again bound the six brothers, and reimprisoned them in Tartarus.

As in Hesiod's account, Cronus swallowed his children; but Zeus, who was saved by Rhea, freed his siblings, and together they waged war against the Titans. According to Apollodorus, in the tenth year of the war, Zeus learned from Gaia, that to win he needed both the Hundred-Handers and the Cyclopes, so Zeus slew their warder Campe and released them:

Others
The fifth-century BC philosopher Plato, in his dialogue Laws, mentions, in passing emphasizing the importance of training soldiers involving all hands(which are normally two), "That indeed if a man is gifted in the form of Briareus, with his hundred hands, he should train with his 100 hands".

The first-century AD Latin poet Horace, twice mentions "centimanus" ('hundred-handed') Gyges. In one poem Gyges and the "fiery Chimaera" are given as examples of fearsome creatures. In another poem, Gyges is used as an example of "power" hated by the gods "that devises every kind of evil in its heart."

According to the second-century AD geographer Pausanias, a Corinthian legend said that Briareus was the arbitrator in a dispute between Poseidon and Helios (Sun) over some land. Briareus adjudged that the Isthmus of Corinth belonged to Poseidon and the acropolis of Corinth (Acrocorinth) to Helios.

Servius, the late fourth-century, early fifth-century AD commentator on Virgil,  also seems to know of two versions of the Titanomachy, one in which the Hundred-Handers fought on the side of the Olympians, as in Hesiod, and the other in which they fought on the side of the Titans, as in the lost Titanomachy.

The fifth-century AD Greek poet Nonnus, in his Dionysiaca, mentions Briareus with his "ready hands" and Aegaeon as the "protector of [Zeus'] laws."

 In literature 
Briareus is mentioned twice in Dante Alighieri's Divine Comedy (completed 1320); he is first found as a giant inhabiting the Ninth Circle of Hell and then again as an example of pride, carved into the pavement of the first terrace of Purgatory. He is also mentioned in Chapter 8 of Don Quixote, his arms being compared to the whirling sails of a windmill. Miguel de Cervantes may have had in mind Virgil, Dante and Giulio Romano's Hall of Giants.

See also
 Asura (Buddhism)
 Greek mythology in popular culture

Notes

References

 Aelian, Historical Miscellany, translated by Nigel G. Wilson, Loeb Classical Library No. 486. Cambridge, Massachusetts, Harvard University Press, 1997. . Online version at Harvard University Press.
 Apollodorus, Apollodorus, The Library, with an English Translation by Sir James George Frazer, F.B.A., F.R.S. in 2 Volumes. Cambridge, Massachusetts, Harvard University Press; London, William Heinemann Ltd. 1921. Online version at the Perseus Digital Library.
 Apollonius Rhodius, Argonautica, edited and translated by William H. Race, Loeb Classical Library No. 1, Cambridge, Massachusetts, Harvard University Press, 2009. . Online version at Harvard University Press.
 Artley, Alfred, Ovid Amores II: A Selection, Bloomsbury Publishing, 2018. .
 Bachvarova, Mary R., From Hittite to Homer: The Anatolian Background of Ancient Greek Epic, Cambridge University Press, Mar 10, 2016. 
 Bakhuizen, Simon C., Studies in the Topography of Chalcis on Euboea: (a Discussion of the Sources), Chalcidian Studies I, Leiden, E. J. Brill, 1985. .
 Boffa, Giovanni, and Barbara Leone, "Euboean cults and myths outside Euboea: Poseidon and Briareos/Aigaion", in An Island between two Worlds: The Archaeology of Euboea from Prehistoric to Byzantine Times, Proceedings of International Conference, Eretria, 12–14 July 2013, edited by Žarko Tankosić, Fanis Mavridis and Maria Kosma, Norwegian Institute at Athens, 2017. . PDF .
 Bos, A. P., Cosmic and Meta-Cosmic Theology in Aristotle's Lost Dialogues, BRILL, 1989. .
 Bremmer, Jan, Greek Religion and Culture, the Bible and the Ancient Near East, BRILL, 2008, .
 Brill's New Pauly: Encyclopaedia of the Ancient World, Volume 6, Hat-Jus, editors: Hubert Cancik, Helmuth Schneider, Brill Publishers, 2005.
 Callimachus, Callimachus and Lycophron with an English translation by A. W. Mair ; Aratus, with an English translation by G. R. Mair, London: W. Heinemann, New York: G. P. Putnam 1921. Internet Archive.
 Callimachus, Musaeus, Aetia, Iambi, Hecale and Other Fragments, Hero and Leander, edited and translated by C. A. Trypanis, T. Gelzer, Cedric H. Whitman, Loeb Classical Library No. 421, Cambridge, Massachusetts, Harvard University Press, 1973. Online version at Harvard University Press. .
 Campbell, David A., Greek Lyric, Volume III: Stesichorus, Ibycus, Simonides, and Others,  Loeb Classical Library No. 476, Cambridge, Massachusetts, Harvard University Press, 1991. . Online version at Harvard University Press.
 Campbell, David A., Greek Lyric, Volume IV: Bacchylides, Corinna,  Loeb Classical Library No. 461. Cambridge, Massachusetts: Harvard University Press. . Online version at Harvard University Press.
 Caldwell, Richard, Hesiod's Theogony, Focus Publishing/R. Pullins Company (June 1, 1987). .
 Dowden, Ken, Zeus, Routledge, 2006. .
 Farnell, Lewis Richard, The Cults of the Greek States vol 1, Clarendon Press, Oxford, 1896. Internet Archive.
 Fowler, R. L. (1988), "ΑΙΓ- in Early Greek Language and Myth", Phoenix, Vol. 42, No. 2 (Summer, 1988), pp. 95–113. .
 Fowler, R. L. (2000), Early Greek Mythography: Volume 1: Text and Introduction, Oxford University Press, 2000. .
 Fowler, R. L. (2013), Early Greek Mythography: Volume 2: Commentary, Oxford University Press, 2013. .
 Frazer, James George, Fastorum libri sex: The Fasti of Ovid, Volume 3: Commentary on Books 3 and 4, Cambridge University Press, 2015. .
 Gantz, Timothy, Early Greek Myth: A Guide to Literary and Artistic Sources, Johns Hopkins University Press, 1996, Two volumes:  (Vol. 1),  (Vol. 2).
 Grimal, Pierre, The Dictionary of Classical Mythology, Wiley-Blackwell, 1996. .
 Hansen, William, Handbook of Classical Mythology, ABC-CLIO, 2004. .
 Hard, Robin, The Routledge Handbook of Greek Mythology: Based on H.J. Rose's "Handbook of Greek Mythology", Psychology Press, 2004, . Google Books.
 Hasluck, F. W., Cyzicus, Cambridge University Press, 1910.
 Hawes, Greta, Rationalizing Myth in Antiquity, Oxford University Press, 2014. .
 Hesiod, Theogony, in Hesiod, Theogony, Works and Days, Testimonia, Edited and translated by Glenn W. Most. Loeb Classical Library No. 57. Cambridge, Massachusetts, Harvard University Press, 2018. . Online version at Harvard University Press.
 Heyworth, S. J., Ovid: Fasti Book 3, Book 3, Cambridge University Press, 2019, . 
 Homer, The Iliad with an English Translation by A.T. Murray, Ph.D. in two volumes. Cambridge, Massachusetts, Harvard University Press; London, William Heinemann, Ltd. 1924. Online version at the Perseus Digital Library.
 Homer, The Odyssey with an English Translation by A.T. Murray, PH.D. in two volumes. Cambridge, Massachusetts, Harvard University Press; London, William Heinemann, Ltd. 1919. Online version at the Perseus Digital Library.
 Horace. Odes and Epodes. Edited and translated by Niall Rudd. Loeb Classical Library No. 33. Cambridge, Massachusetts: Harvard University Press, 2004. Online version at Harvard University Press.
 Kerényi, Carl, The Gods of the Greeks,  Thames and Hudson, London, 1951.
 Kirk, G. S.; The Iliad: A Commentary: Volume 1, Books 1-4, Cambridge University Press, 1985. .
 Lattimore, Richard, The Iliad of Homer, translated with an introduction by Richard Lattimore, University of Chicago Press, 1951.
 Leaf, Walter, The Iliad, Edited, with Apparatus Criticus, Prolegomena, Notes, and Appendices, Vol I, Books I–XII, second edition, London, Macmillan and Co., limited; New York, The Macmillan Company, 1900. Internet Archive.
 Liddell, Henry George, Robert Scott. A Greek-English Lexicon. Revised and augmented throughout by Sir Henry Stuart Jones with the assistance of. Roderick McKenzie. Oxford. Clarendon Press. 1940. Online version at the Perseus Digital Library
 Lightfoot, J. L., Hellenistic Collection: Philitas, Alexander of Aetolia, Hermesianax, Euphorion, Parthenius, edited and translated by J. L. Lightfoot, Loeb Classical Library No. 508. Cambridge, Massachusetts, Harvard University Press, 2010. . Online version at Harvard University Press.
 Matthews, Victor J., Antimachus of Colophon: Text and Commentary, BRILL, 1996. .
 Mineur, W. H., Callimachus: Hymn to Delos, Brill Archive, 1984. .
 Nonnus, Dionysiaca; translated by Rouse, W H D, III Books XXXVI–XLVIII. Loeb Classical Library No. 346, Cambridge, Massachusetts, Harvard University Press; London, William Heinemann Ltd. 1940. Internet Archive.
 O'Hara, James J., Inconsistency in Roman Epic: Studies in Catullus, Lucretius, Vergil, Ovid and Lucan, Cambridge University Press, 2007. .
 Ovid, Amores in Heroides. Amores. Translated by Grant Showerman. Revised by G. P. Goold. Loeb Classical Library No. 41. Cambridge, Massachusetts: Harvard University Press, 1977. . Online version at Harvard University Press.
 Ovid, Ovid's Fasti: With an English translation by Sir James George Frazer, London: W. Heinemann LTD; Cambridge, Massachusetts: : Harvard University Press, 1959. Internet Archive.
 Ovid. Metamorphoses, Volume I: Books 1-8. Translated by Frank Justus Miller. Revised by G. P. Goold. Loeb Classical Library No. 42. Cambridge, Massachusetts: Harvard University Press, 1916. Online version at Harvard University Press.
 Ovid. Tristia. Ex Ponto. Translated by A. L. Wheeler. Revised by G. P. Goold. Loeb Classical Library NO. 151. Cambridge, Massachusetts: Harvard University Press, 1924. Online version at Harvard University Press.
 Pausanias, Pausanias Description of Greece with an English Translation by W.H.S. Jones, Litt.D., and H.A. Ormerod, M.A., in 4 Volumes. Cambridge, Massachusetts, Harvard University Press; London, William Heinemann Ltd. 1918. Online version at the Perseus Digital Library.
Pausanias, Graeciae Descriptio. 3 vols. Leipzig, Teubner. 1903.  Greek text available at the Perseus Digital Library.
 Philostratus, The Life of Apollonius of Tyana: Volume I. Books 1-5, translated by F.C. Conybeare, Loeb Classical Library No. 16. Harvard University Press, Cambridge, Massachusetts, 1912. . Internet Archive
 Plato, Laws in Plato in Twelve Volumes, Vols. 10 & 11 translated by R.G. Bury. Cambridge, Massachusetts, Harvard University Press; London, William Heinemann Ltd. 1967 & 1968.  Online version at the Perseus Digital Library
 Pliny the Elder, Natural History, Volume II: Books 3-7, translated by H. Rackham, Loeb Classical Library No. 352. Cambridge, Massachusetts, Harvard University Press, 1942. . Online version at Harvard University Press.
 Servius, Commentary on the Aeneid of Vergil, Georgius Thilo, Ed. 1881. Online version at the Perseus Digital Library (Latin).
 Sprawski, Slawomir, "Writing Local History: Archemachus and His Euboika" in The Children of Herodotus: Greek and Roman Historiography and Related Genres, editor Jakub Pigoń, Cambridge Scholars Publishing, Dec 18, 2008. .
 Statius, Thebaid, Volume I: Thebaid: Books 1-7, edited and translated by D. R. Shackleton Bailey, Loeb Classical Library No. 207, Cambridge, Massachusetts, Harvard University Press, 2004. . Online version at Harvard University Press.
 Strabo, Geography, translated by Horace Leonard Jones; Cambridge, Massachusetts: Harvard University Press; London: William Heinemann, Ltd. (1924). LacusCurtis, Online version at the Perseus Digital Library, Books 6–14
 Stern, Jacob, Palaephatus: On Unbelievable Tales. Wauconda, Ill.: Bolchazy-Carducci, 1996, .
 Tripp, Edward, Crowell's Handbook of Classical Mythology, Thomas Y. Crowell Co; First edition (June 1970). .
 Tsagalis, Christos, Early Greek Epic Fragments I: Antiquarian and Genealogical Epic, Walter de Gruyter GmbH & Co KG, 2017. .
 Virgil, Aeneid, in Eclogues, Georgics, Aeneid: Books 1-6, translated by H. Rushton Fairclough, revised by G. P. Goold, Loeb Classical Library No. 63, Cambridge, Massachusetts, Harvard University Press, 1916. Online version at Harvard University Press. .
 Virgil, Aeneid, Theodore C. Williams. trans. Boston. Houghton Mifflin Co. 1910. Online version at the Perseus Digital Library.
 West, M. L. (1966), Hesiod: Theogony, Oxford University Press. .
 West, M. L. (1983), The Orphic Poems, Clarendon Press. .
 West, M. L. (1988), Hesiod: Theogony and Works and Days, Oxford University Press. .
 West, M. L. (2002), "'Eumelos': A Corinthian Epic Cycle?" in The Journal of Hellenic Studies, vol. 122, pp. 109–133. .
 West, M. L. (2003), Greek Epic Fragments: From the Seventh to the Fifth Centuries BC. Edited and translated by Martin L. West. Loeb Classical Library No. 497. Cambridge, Massachusetts: Harvard University Press, 2003.  . Online version at Harvard University Press.
 Wellauer, Augustus, Apollonii Rhodii, Argonautica, Volume 2, sumtibus et typis B.G. Teubneri, 1828.
 Willcock, Malcome M., A Companion to the Iliad'', University of Chicago Press, 1976. .

Greek giants
Greek legendary creatures
Children of Gaia
Legendary creatures with supernumerary body parts
Mythical many-headed creatures
Mythological trios
Deeds of Zeus